Pacayas is a district of the Alvarado canton, in the Cartago province of Costa Rica.

Geography 
Pacayas has an area of  km² and an elevation of  metres.

Demographics 

For the 2011 census, Pacayas had a population of  inhabitants.

Transportation

Road transportation 
The district is covered by the following road routes:
 National Route 219
 National Route 230
 National Route 402
 National Route 417

Economy
It is the home of the cooperative Coopebaires R. L., the main wholesale distributor of potatoes, carrots, broccoli and other fresh vegetables in the north region of Cartago Province.

References 

Districts of Cartago Province
Populated places in Cartago Province